Sean Monahan (born October 12, 1994) is a Canadian professional ice hockey centre for the Montreal Canadiens of the National Hockey League (NHL). Monahan was selected sixth overall by the Calgary Flames, at the 2013 NHL Entry Draft and he played junior hockey with the Ottawa 67's of the Ontario Hockey League (OHL) where he served as team captain.

Early life
A native of Brampton, Ontario, Sean is the son of Cathy and John Monahan, and has a sister, Jacqueline. He attended St. Thomas Aquinas Secondary School. He played minor hockey and lacrosse for the Brampton Excelsiors, where one of his teammates was former Syracuse and NBA guard Tyler Ennis.

Playing career

Junior
Monahan played  with the Mississauga Rebels.  As a 15-year-old in 2010, he captained the Rebels to an OHL Cup title and was named most valuable player of the tournament. He finished the 2009–10 season with 46 goals and 40 assists in 47 games for the Rebels and was then selected by the Ottawa 67's in the first round, 16th overall, at the Ontario Hockey League (OHL) Priority Selection draft. Monahan's junior hockey career began with difficulty as he suffered a sprained wrist in his first training camp with the 67's, resulting in a slow start for him in the 2010–11 OHL season.  An invitation to play in the 2011 World U-17 Hockey Challenge, in which he was a key performer for the gold medal-winning Team Ontario, allowed Monahan to regain confidence; he completed his first OHL season on the 67's second line and recorded 47 points in 65 games. Monahan played in his second international tournament following the season.  He joined the Canadian Under-18 National Team for the 2011 Ivan Hlinka Memorial Tournament and scored a goal in the championship game to help Canada win a fourth consecutive gold medal at the event.

Playing alongside NHL prospects Tyler Toffoli, Shane Prince and Cody Ceci, Monahan was one of the OHL's top scorers in the 2011–12.  He finished tied for 15th in league scoring with 78 points. He was named to the OHL's Second All-Star team and was the 67's representative on the league's All-Scholastic team.  Monahan's third season in Ottawa was a transitional one for the franchise.  The 67's had won three consecutive East Division titles between 2010 and 2012, but the graduation of top players caused the team to enter a rebuilding phase. The 67's finished in last place in the 2012–13 OHL season with just 16 wins. Monahan served as the team's captain, sharing the role with Ceci in the first half of the season until the latter player's departure in a trade. He finished the season with 31 goals and 78 points. He was invited to Team Canada's selection camp for the 2013 World Junior Ice Hockey Championships, but failed to make the team. He also missed ten games during the season after being suspended for an elbowing incident.

Calgary Flames
Monahan was one of the top-ranked prospects for the 2013 NHL Entry Draft: The NHL Central Scouting Bureau ranked him as the 5th best North American skater in its final ranking while International Scouting Services ranked him 9th overall. Among OHL draft prospects, the league's coaches rated Monahan highly for his intelligence on the ice, playmaking and stickhandling, and for his faceoff ability. He was selected in the first round, sixth overall, by the Calgary Flames. Upon his selection, the 18-year-old centre expressed his confidence that he was ready to immediately play in the NHL. He earned a spot on the Flames roster to begin the 2013–14 season and made his NHL debut on October 3, 2013, against the Washington Capitals.  Monahan scored his first career point in the game, assisting on David Jones' goal in a 5–4 shootout loss. He then scored his first goal the following night against goaltender Sergei Bobrovsky of the Columbus Blue Jackets in a 4–3 win.

Though he remained eligible to return to junior without impacting his NHL contract, Monahan scored six goals in his first nine games to earn a permanent spot in Calgary. In doing so, he became the first junior-eligible player to make the full-time jump to the Flames roster since Kevin LaVallee in 33 years. Monahan scored his 20th goal in a late-season loss to the Ottawa Senators, and in doing so, became the first Flames rookie to score 20 goals since Dion Phaneuf in 2005–06 and first rookie forward since Jarome Iginla in 1996–97 to reach the mark.

On August 19, 2016, following back-to-back seasons in which he scored 60 or more points, Monahan, as a restricted free agent signed a seven-year, $44.625 million contract extension to remain in the Flames' organization through 2023. During the  season, Monahan scored his 100th career goal against Andrei Vasilevskiy of the Tampa Bay Lightning on February 23, 2017. He is the 6th youngest active player to achieve this milestone, joining the elite company of Alexander Ovechkin, Sidney Crosby, Jaromír Jágr, Steven Stamkos, and Patrick Kane. His 100th goal also marked his 20th of the season, marking the 4 consecutive season he has scored at least 20 goals. He was the youngest player in Flames' history to reach the 100-goal milestone (22 years, 134 days), passing Joe Nieuwendyk, who was 22 years and 185 days old when he scored 100th career goal.

On November 18, 2017, in a game against the Philadelphia Flyers, Monahan scored his first career hat trick in the second period to help the Flames win 5–4. He became the fastest player in the Flames’ franchise to record 9 career overtime goals when he scored his 9th on December 7, 2017 vs the Montreal Canadiens in a 3-2 win. However, his season was cut short in March due to injuries. During the following month, Monahan underwent four surgeries but was expected to be able to play during the 2018–19 season.

During the  season, with the Flames in the midst of a resurgent season and leading the Pacific Division, Monahan was playing in a reduced role and on pace for a career-low in points-per-game. On April 2, 2022, after recording 8 goals and 23 points through 65 regular season games, it was announced he would undergo season-ending surgery on his right hip. Monahan later reflected on his final season with the Flames, relating "I tore the labrum of my other hip three games into last season and kept playing. Later on, I suffered three fractured ribs. They were protruding out of my back and it was brutal. There were days where I don't even know what I was doing practicing because I couldn't even tie my own skates."

Montreal Canadiens
On August 18, 2022, Monahan was traded, along with a conditional first-round pick in 2025 to the Montreal Canadiens in exchange for future considerations. The Flames made the trade in order to create salary cap room to sign free agent Nazem Kadri. Monahan made his debut in the Canadiens' season-opening game on October 12, and scored his first goal for the team that night in what proved to be a 4–3 victory over traditional archrival the Toronto Maple Leafs. The occasion coincided with his birthday. Defying some expectations regarding his physical capabilities post-surgery, Monahan enjoyed a revival in his first two months with the Canadiens. In his return to Calgary on December 1, Monahan assisted on both of the team's goals in a 2–1 victory over the Flames, despite being in a walking boot prior as a result of a foot injury. Days later, after scoring a goal in an away game against the Vancouver Canucks, he exited due to discomfort. It was subsequently revealed that he would miss two to three weeks with a lower body injury.

Career statistics

Regular season and playoffs

International

Awards and honours

References

External links
 

1994 births
Calgary Flames draft picks
Calgary Flames players
Canadian ice hockey centres
Ice hockey people from Ontario
Living people
Montreal Canadiens players
National Hockey League first-round draft picks
Ottawa 67's players
Sportspeople from Brampton